Soufian Benyamina (born 2 March 1990) is a German footballer who plays as a forward for Greifswalder FC.

Personal life
His older brother Karim is also professional footballer and is currently playing for Berliner AK 07 and the Algerian national team.

Career
Benyamina began his career in the youth side with MSV Normannia 08 Berlin. He was later scouted by Hertha BSC. After few years with Hertha BSC, he joined rival 1. FC Union Berlin, where he played twenty three games and scored four goals in the A Jugend Bundesliga Nord/Nordost in the 2008–09 season. He left Union Berlin in July 2009 and signed for FC Carl Zeiss Jena. Here played his first professional match in the 3. Liga on 29 July 2009 against SV Sandhausen and scored on 25 October 2009 his first goal against SpVgg Unterhaching. On 14 June 2010, he left Carl Zeiss Jena and signed for VfB Stuttgart II. He signed in Stuttgart a three years contract and played first for the 3. Liga team.

On 8 December 2012, Benyamina made his Bundesliga debut for the first team of VfB Stuttgart in a 3–1 home victory against FC Schalke 04.

On 1 July 2013, he moved to Dynamo Dresden. After an unsuccessful half-season, in which Benyamina made only 4 appearances for Dynamo, the club loaned him to 3rd division club Preußen Münster in the winter transfer window. At the end of the season he left Dynamo permanently, signing for SV Wehen Wiesbaden. 

In August 2015, Benyamina signed for 3. Liga club F.C. Hansa Rostock on a three-year deal.

Career statistics

References

External links

 

Living people
1990 births
German people of Algerian descent
German sportspeople of African descent
Footballers from Berlin
Association football midfielders
German footballers
FC Carl Zeiss Jena players
VfB Stuttgart II players
VfB Stuttgart players
Dynamo Dresden players
SC Preußen Münster players
SV Wehen Wiesbaden players
FC Hansa Rostock players
Pogoń Szczecin players
FC Viktoria 1889 Berlin players
3. Liga players
Bundesliga players
2. Bundesliga players
VfB Lübeck players
Regionalliga players